Jennifer Love may refer to:
Jennifer Love (chemist), American chemist
Jennifer Love, Miss Nebraska 1994
Jennifer Love Hewitt, American television and movie actress